Willie Gates (born January 21, 1987) is an American mixed martial artist currently competing in the Flyweight division. A professional competitor since 2008, he has competed for the UFC, King of the Cage, Tachi Palace Fights, and Bellator MMA.

Mixed martial arts career

Early career
Born and raised in the Inland Empire region of Southern California, Gates began training in mixed martial arts in 2004.  He made his professional debut as a lightweight in October 2008 where he competed in several regional promotions. Gates fought predominantly in his native state of California where he amassed a record of 11–4, competing primarily in the bantamweight division before joining the Ultimate Fighting Championship.

Ultimate Fighting Championship
Gates made his promotional debut as a short notice replacement for an injured Jussier Formiga against John Moraga on December 13, 2014, at UFC on Fox 13. He lost the back-and-forth fight via submission in the third round.

Gates faced Darrell Montague on July 12, 2015, at The Ultimate Fighter 21 Finale. Gates won the one-sided fight via TKO in the first round.

In a quick turnaround, Gates faced Dustin Ortiz on August 8, 2015, at UFC Fight Night 73, filling in for an injured Ian McCall. He lost the fight via TKO in the third round.

Gates was expected to face Patrick Holohan on May 8, 2016, at UFC Fight Night 87. However, on April 25, Holohan abruptly announced his retirement, citing a rare blood disorder. He was replaced on the card by Ulka Sasaki. Gates lost the fight via submission in the second round.

On June 3 Willie Gates was released from the promotion.

Mixed martial arts record

|-
|Loss
|align=center|12–12
|Musa Toliver
|Decision (split)
|LXF 8: The Return
|
|align=center|3
|align=center|5:00
|Commerce, California, United States
|
|-
| Loss
|align=center|12–11
| Ryan MacDonald
| TKO (punches)
| Art of Scrap 3
| 
|align=center|3
|align=center|1:56
| Fort Wayne, Indiana, United States
|
|-
| Loss
|align=center|12–10
| Marvin Garcia
| Decision (unanimous)
| KOTC: Sin Rival
| 
|align=center|3
|align=center|5:00
| Ontario, California, United States
|
|-
| Loss
|align=center|12–9
| George Garcia
| Submission (rear-naked choke)
| CXF 15: Rage in the Cage
| 
|align=center|2
|align=center|2:33
| Burbank, California, United States
|
|-
| Loss
|align=center|12–8
| Andre Ewell
| Submission (rear-naked choke)
| KOTC: Never Quit 
| 
|align=center|3
|align=center|2:47
| Ontario, California, United States
|
|-
|Loss
|align=center|12–7
|Ulka Sasaki
|Submission (rear-naked choke)
|UFC Fight Night: Overeem vs. Arlovski
|
|align=center|2
|align=center|2:30
|Rotterdam, Netherlands
| 
|-
|Loss
|align=center|12–6
|Dustin Ortiz
|TKO (elbows and punches)
|UFC Fight Night: Teixeira vs. Saint Preux
|
|align=center|3
|align=center|2:58
|Nashville, Tennessee, United States
|
|-
| Win
| align=center| 12–5
| Darrell Montague
| TKO (knees to the body and elbows)
| The Ultimate Fighter: American Top Team vs. Blackzilians Finale
| 
| align=center| 1
| align=center| 1:36
| Las Vegas, Nevada, United States
| 
|-
| Loss
| align=center| 11–5
| John Moraga
| Submission (rear-naked choke)
| UFC on Fox: dos Santos vs. Miocic
| 
| align=center| 3
| align=center| 4:06
| Phoenix, Arizona, United States
| 
|-
| Win
| align=center| 11–4
| Hector Sandoval
| TKO (punches)
| TPF 21: All or Nothing
| 
| align=center| 1
| align=center| 1:23
| Lemoore, California, United States
| 
|-
| Win
| align=center| 10–4
| Jimmy Marquez
| Submission (rear-naked choke)
| Gladiator Challenge: Glove Up
| 
| align=center| 1
| align=center| 1:36
| San Jacinto, California, United States
| 
|-
| Win
| align=center| 9–4
| Chris Chavez
| KO (knee)
| Gladiator Challenge: Battle Ready
| 
| align=center| 1
| align=center| 1:10
| El Cajon, California, United States
| 
|-
| Win
| align=center| 8–4
| Eddy Gonzalez
| Submission (armbar)
| Gladiator Challenge: Night of the Champions
| 
| align=center| 1
| align=center| 0:20
| Rancho Mirage, California, United States
| 
|-
| Win
| align=center| 7–4
| Mario Casares
| Submission (rear-naked choke)
| Gladiator Challenge: Nitro
| 
| align=center| 1
| align=center| 1:59
| San Jacinto, California, United States
|Won vacant Gladiator Challenge Bantamweight Championship.
|-
| Loss
| align=center| 6–4
| Anthony Perales
| Submission (armbar)
| SCMMA 2: Inland Empire Strikes Again
| 
| align=center| 3
| align=center| 1:43
| Ontario, California, United States
| 
|-
| Win
| align=center| 6–3
| Justin Santistevan
| Submission
| Gladiator Challenge: Battleground
| 
| align=center| 1
| align=center| 0:28
| San Jacinto, California, United States
| 
|-
| Win
| align=center| 5–3
| Gary Franklin
| TKO (punches)
| Gladiator Challenge: Heat Returns
| 
| align=center| 1
| align=center| 0:15
| San Jacinto, California, United States
| 
|-
| Loss
| align=center| 4–3
| Federico Lopez
| Decision (unanimous)
| MEZ Sports: Pandemonium 7
| 
| align=center| 3
| align=center| 5:00
| Inglewood, California, United States
| 
|-
| Win
| align=center| 4–2
| Jason Carbajal
| Decision (unanimous)
| FCOC: Fight Club OC
| 
| align=center| 3
| align=center| 5:00
| Costa Mesa, California, United States
| 
|-
| Win
| align=center| 3–2
| Keenan Lewis
| Decision (split)
| National Fight Alliance: Valley Invasion 2
| 
| align=center| 3
| align=center| 5:00
| Los Angeles, California, United States
| 
|-
| Win
| align=center| 2–2
| Thomas Casarez
| Decision (unanimous)
| LBFN 13: Long Beach Fight Night 13
| 
| align=center| 3
| align=center| 3:00
| Long Beach, California, United States
| 
|-
| Win
| align=center| 1–2
| Skylar Reider
| TKO (punches)
| LBFN 11: Long Beach Fight Night 11
| 
| align=center| 1
| align=center| 1:14
| Long Beach, California, United States
|
|-
| Loss
| align=center| 0–2
| Jimmie Rivera
| Submission (triangle choke)
| Bellator 2
| 
| align=center| 3
| align=center| 3:17
| Uncasville, Connecticut, United States
| 
|-
| Loss
| align=center| 0–1
| Robbie Peralta
| TKO (punches)
| GC 85: Cross Fire
| 
| align=center| 1
| align=center| 3:50
| San Diego, California, United States
|

See also
List of current UFC fighters
List of male mixed martial artists

References

External links

Living people
1987 births
American male mixed martial artists
Flyweight mixed martial artists
People from Fontana, California
Ultimate Fighting Championship male fighters